Elmar Xeyirov (born 14 January 1987) is a retired Azerbaijani professional footballer.

He was called up for Azerbaijan U21 national team during 2007–08 qualifying cycle.

References

External links 
 
 
 

1987 births
Living people
Azerbaijani footballers
Association football midfielders
Azerbaijani expatriate footballers
Expatriate footballers in Belarus
Shamakhi FK players
Simurq PIK players
FC Partizan Minsk players
FC Darida Minsk Raion players
FC Smorgon players